Bells  are a suit in playing cards of the Swiss-suited and German-suited cards. Unlike the other German suits, this suit was not adapted by French card makers. In its place, there was initially a suit of red crescents until the suit of Diamonds was added to the French pack (known as tiles in France). The suit is usually known in German as Schellen, but is sometimes abbreviated to Schell. Cards are referred to as in a French deck e.g. the "9 of Bells", but in German as "Schellen 9", or the "Unter of Bells" (Schellunter or Schell-Unter).

Bells are the lowest suit in Skat, Schafkopf and Doppelkopf, but the second highest in Préférence.

The 7 of Bells (Schellen 7) or, in South Tyrol the 6 of Bells (Belle, Weli) is the second highest trump card in the game of Watten.

The gallery below shows a suit of Bells from a German suited pack of 32 cards, plus the Weli or 6 of Bells which is used in some games as an 'honour' card. The main pack is of the Saxonian pattern:

References 

Card suits